The Asian Journal of Management Cases is a peer reviewed academic journal that publishes cases and research on management practices in the unique socio-economic environment of developing Asian countries.

The journal is published twice a year by SAGE Publications (New Delhi) in collaboration with the Lahore University of Management Sciences.

This journal is a member of the Committee on Publication Ethics (COPE).

Abstracting and indexing 
Asian Journal of Management Cases is abstracted and indexed in:
 SCOPUS
 DeepDyve
 Portico
 Dutch-KB
 Pro-Quest-RSP
 EBSCO
 ProQuest-Illustrata
 J-Gate

References 

 http://publicationethics.org/members/asian-journal-management-cases

External links 
 

SAGE Publishing academic journals
Publications established in 2004
Business and management journals